Ratchasakun refers to the surnames indicating royal descent from a Thai monarch of the Chakri Dynasty, first established in 1912 after King Rama VI enacted a series of laws granting surnames to the Thai people, with the laws expressly stating that all Thai citizens must have a "surname" indicating who they are related to, or whom they are descended from, with those who are direct members of the royal bloodlines to be called ratchasakun, those who have marital ties to the royal family to be referred to as ratchanikun (ราชนิกุล), and those descended from a Chakri Front Palace to be called bowon ratchasakun (บวรราชสกุล).

Ratchatrakul 
Ratchatrakul (ราชตระกูล)  are the royal houses which are descended directly from the siblings of King Rama I. This refers to those not of the immediate royal family, meaning those of the rank of Serene Highness (Mom Chao) or below. Untitled ratchasakun or spouses of ratchasakun shall take the suffix of na Ayudhya (modern alternatives: Na Ayutthaya) behind the surname as well, to signify royal heritage.

Ratchasakun 
Ratchasakun (ราชสกุล) refers to those who are directly descended from a Thai monarch. This refers to those not of the immediate royal family, meaning those of the rank of Serene Highness (Mom Chao) or below. Untitled ratchasakun or spouses of ratchasakun shall take the suffix of Na Ayudhya (modern alternatives: Na Ayutthaya) behind the surname as well, to signify royal heritage.

Royal Houses descended from Rama I

Royal Houses descended from Rama II

Royal Houses descended from Rama III

Royal Houses descended from Rama IV 

*Order column derived from the original numerical order taken by Rama VI when granting surnames. Some were omitted from the original count by the king:Kritākara: Not counted in Rama VI's specific order, granted as the 721st surname.

Gaganānga: No surviving male descendants at the time of granting.

Navavongsa: Not counted by Rama VI in his specific order, but granted as the 226th surname.

Supratishtha: Not counted by Rama VI in his specific order, granted as the 1403rd surname.

Royal Houses descended from Rama V

Royal Houses descended from Rama VII

Sources 

This is a direct translation of the Thai language Wikipedia page.

References

 ย้อนรอยสายราชสกุล... ในพระบรมราชจักรีวงศ์ (๑) โดย ผู้จัดการรายวัน 11 กุมภาพันธ์ 2551 17:45 น.
 ย้อนรอยสายราชสกุล... ในพระบรมราชจักรีวงศ์ (จบ) โดย ผู้จัดการรายวัน 13 กุมภาพันธ์ 2551 08:36 น.

Thai monarchy
Chakri dynasty